BEXCO station is a station on the Busan Metro Line 2 and Donghae Line in U-dong, Haeundae District, Busan, South Korea. The subname in parentheses is "Busan Museum of Modern Art". The metro station was formerly named "Busan Museum of Modern Art Station", and the Donghae Line station was formerly "Uil Station".

Station Layout

Line 2

Donghae Line

Gallery

External links

 Cyber station information from Busan Transportation Corporation 

Busan Metro stations
Korail stations
Haeundae District
Railway stations in Busan
Railway stations opened in 1996
Railway stations opened in 2002
1996 establishments in South Korea
2002 establishments in South Korea
20th-century architecture in South Korea